The Screwy Truant is a 1945 Screwy Squirrel cartoon directed by Tex Avery and released by MGM.

Summary
The cartoon centers around an adolescent version of Screwy Squirrel, who skips school to go fishing, which causes truant officer Meathead Dog (here seen with a different color palette but otherwise the same) to go around attempting to arrest Screwy, with various failures. At the end, Meathead finally catches Screwy and demands to know why he is not in school. Screwy tells him the reason is because he has measles, much to the horror of Meathead, who has now contracted measles from him.

Cameo
Tex Avery's versions of Little Red Riding Hood and the Big Bad Wolf (from Swing Shift Cinderella) make a cameo appearance. In the middle of the cartoon, the two characters interrupt one of Screwy's antics with "Wolfie" chasing Little Red Riding Hood across the screen, only for Screwy to interrupt that action by showing the wolf the title of the cartoon and informing him that he is in the wrong "picture". Swing Shift Cinderella would not premiere until seven months after the release of The Screwy Truant, so it could be inferred that its script was still being written at the time and Avery wanted to provide theater audiences with a "teaser" for that upcoming short.

References

External links

1945 animated films
1945 films
1945 short films
Metro-Goldwyn-Mayer animated short films
1940s American animated films
1940s animated short films
Animated films about squirrels
Films directed by Tex Avery
Films scored by Scott Bradley
Films with screenplays by Henry Wilson Allen
Films produced by Fred Quimby
Films about the education system in the United States
Metro-Goldwyn-Mayer cartoon studio short films
Red (animated character) films
Tex Avery's Big Bad Wolf films